Dương Văn An (1514 – ?; courtesy name: Tỉnh Phú, 楊文安) was a minister in the cabinet of the Mạc dynasty. He was born in 1514 in Tuy Lộc Village, Lộc Thủy Commune, Lệ Thủy district, Quảng Bình province. He was the author of a geography-history book about châu O, Ô Châu cận lục, Hán tự: 烏州近錄 (lit.: Recent records of Ô Prefecture). Though Ô Prefecture was in fact from now Quảng Bình to Quảng Nam provinces, the book recorded the history and geography of today Quảng Bình, Quảng Trị and Thừa Thiên–Huế provinces.

References

People from Quảng Bình province
1514 births
16th-century Vietnamese historians
Year of death unknown
Date of birth unknown